The following list is of characters from Sorcerous Stabber Orphen.

Characters

Main characters

Orphen is the main protagonist of the Sorcerous Stabber Orphen series and the title character, is known for his arrogance, gruff demeanor, short temper, and near-obsessive drive to finish what he is working on as soon as possible without distraction. He also strives to remain stoic and detached from others save his closest friends and allies. However, he has a strong sense of humanity and even though he will often complain, he will not abandon a person in need nor tolerate the slaughter of innocent. He is an anti-hero throughout the entire series. In the anime, the only time his attitude changes is when the subject of Azalie is brought up. He will do anything for Azalie, as they have quite a history together, but Orphen keeps his feelings and the story about Azalie to himself at first, only opening up later in the series. However, in the novels, he opens up about Azalie fairly quickly. He later becomes acerbic and callous towards her after she murders Childman and attempts to manipulate him on multiple occasions for her own ends. He, Leticia and Azalie were brought to the school together by Wall Karen because it was believed that they possessed a strong amount of magical power within them. This proved correct; Orphen was a magic prodigy. Orphen eventually becomes the greatest sorcerer in the world. In the novels, Orphen is characterized slightly differently, being more rough, profane and seemingly unstable than his anime portrayal. He suffers from increasing megalomania and what seems to be a type of dissociative identity disorder in which he sometimes thinks of Krylancelo and Orphen as two different individuals. However, through the company of his apprentice, Majic and the heiress Claiomh Everlasting, he steadily becomes more at peace with himself and learns to accept who he is. As a child, Orphen was trained to be a Stabber, which is a sorcerer trained in the art of eliminating other sorcerers with secret assassination techniques and deadly spells beyond conventional knowledge, though he actively resents his training since he despises killing. In the novels, he eventually gains the power and knowledge of the Demon King Swedenborge and temporarily attains the Dark Magic of the Fenrir by merging his mind with Leki's, though both of these magicks can tax on his sanity and health when he utilizes them. By the end of the original novella series, Orphen left the continent of Kiesalhima along with Claiomh Everlasting to settle down on the Hara continent. They later marry and have their daughters, Ratsbane, Edge and Ratchet. By the age of 43, he becomes the head founder of his own magic academy known the Swedenborge School of Sorcery.

 Claiomh Everlasting (Cleao in the 1998 anime), is a girl that joins Orphen on his journey. In the first anime, she carries the Sword of Baltanders, which was entrusted to her by her father on her fifteenth birthday, and lets Orphen hold onto it as long as he does not object to her tagging along. Claiomh also carries in her backpack a Deep Dragon wolf-cub named Leki. She and Orphen constantly quarrel, but she does so to hide her growing affection for him and secretly longs for him from afar. She and Orphen eventually marry at the end of the original novels and have three daughters. She trains with a long sword and quickly becomes proficient with it as she journeys with Orphen and Majic, even able to duel on even grounds with other highly skilled swordsmen. It is later discovered that Claiomh has magical potential, which is unlocked due to Leki merging his mind with hers and she eventually seeks training from Leticia to develop her latent abilities, which she completed in a year's time. She also becomes skilled in using firearms thanks to her training at the Tower of Fang.

 Majic is Orphen's apprentice, and the secondary male lead. He is a childhood friend of Claiomh's, despite being three years apart in age, and they attended the same classroom in school before she left for boarding school. In the anime, they were in the same grade in school, but she has since moved on to boarding school. Majic deals with the torment brought about from both Claiomh and Orphen's action on their journey together. His father is paying Orphen to teach him, which at first seems a waste of money to his father. When Orphen repairs a glass that fell with his magic before the father's eyes, the father's opinion about his money being "thrown out the window" disappears. Majic appears to be a good student, learning as much as he can, and retaining all of what he learns, although his anxiety tends to get the better of him when it comes time to prove himself. Orphen, however, sees significant potential in Majic and encourages him in his training. This gives him courage, which makes his power stronger. Majic looks up to Orphen, and refers to him as "master" upon Orphen's request. All sorcerers call their "teachers", who teach them sorcery, "master." It is later revealed in the novels  that Majic is a vampire, a rare mutagenic trait within humans which he inherited from his mother, Iris Lin, who is a sorceress/assassin said to rival Childman in terms of power and skill. Due to his vampire blood, his magical potential far exceeds Orphen's. By the end of the novels, Majic has become a famous, world-renowned sorcerer and even takes on Ratsbane, Orphen and Cleao's firstborn child, as his apprentice.

One of the race of Deep Dragon (changed to Wolfen in the original English Dub), Leki is a cub who is found and adopted by Claiomh, although it is indicated by his mother that Leki adopted Claiomh, as adult Deep Dragons are more powerful and intelligent by far than humans. Like all Deep Dragons, Leki resembles a wolf rather than a reptilian dragon, and when he uses his innate magic, his eyes will glow a bright green color. As Leki is still very young, he often exhibits young animal-like tendencies, such as chasing after a butterfly.  Yet in spite of his animalistic behavior, he is very intelligent and perceptive and has instinctual grasp of Dark Magic. He protects and defends Claiomh whenever he feels the need to, or when Claiomh orders him. He is also unique among his clan since he is able to retain his individuality, partially because of his empathetic connection to Claiomh. Leki will not only protect Claiomh, but anyone who he sees in danger. In the first anime, Leki's collar belongs to one of the three artifacts from the Aisle of Baltanders, the Bracelet of Nomafrozis. In the novel, Leki is eventually able to use telepathy to speak with his human companions and released Claiomh's hidden magical potential by linking with her mind. Throughout the novel series, Leki grows from a small cub to the size of a large dog. When exerting his full power, he will temporarily increase his size to that of an adult Deep Dragon.

 Vulcano Volkan  is one of the two dwarven brothers who follow along with Orphen on his quest. He frequently refers to himself the "Masmaturian Bulldog". Volkan always comes up with their plans (which usually turn out to be poorly thought out, utterly bad ideas, and almost never work). He is known to be extremely egotistical, delusional and idiotic. He hates Orphen (whom he refers to as "the black wizard") and his companions, and always finds a way to ruin whatever they had in mind. He was banished from his home of Matmaturia because of his unapologetic troublemaking, and kidnapped his younger brother, to forcibly accompany him in his exile. It is his fault that Orphen often must use his magic to assault them (himself and Dortin) due to the fact that Volkan owes Orphen an exorbitant amount of money and he refuses to pay Orphen back his debt. Volkan wants only power and money, and any scheme he has in mind has the end result in mind getting him one of the two. None of his schemes ever work, however, due his short-sightedness and stupidity. He constantly bosses Dortin around in a very comical fashion. In spite of his ineptitude, he is surprisingly durable as sharp objects such as swords and scythes cannot break his skin and Orphen's magic, no matter how powerful, does not cause him any significant damage. This is largely due to his dwarven physiology. His ego is strong enough to suppress a White Mage within his mind and utilize her sorcery.

Volkan's younger brother. Dortin and Volkan are often viewed as comic relief throughout the series. They are two dwarves who are always low on money, and seem to always find a way to mess up whatever Orphen is trying to accomplish. In the first anime, they worked in Cleao's basement, working as cooks to both pay of their debt to Orphen as well as act as his spies. In the novels, they were forced to work for Claiomh as bodyguards as compensation for breaking them out of jail when they attempted con her older sister, Mariabelle, into a marriage scam. regards to his character, Dortin is the voice of reason (who is often ignored) on his and Volkan's quests. He is kind and knowledgeable, but his swirling glasses give him a rather geekish appearance. When Volkan messes up, Dortin always tries to tell Orphen he had no part in Volkan's schemes, but they both wind up being victims of Orphen's magical blasts anyway. In the anime and novels, Dortin is shown to be quite caring and loyal, as he begs Orphen for help in saving his brother from poisoning and, later in the anime, in defying Volkan's "order" to run from danger when a friend (Childman) needed his help. Dortin is surprisingly skilled at reading runes and has occasionally helped Orphen in deciphering texts by the Nornir. Like his brother, he is also highly resistant to both physical and magical damage due to his dwarven physiology.

An original anime-exclusive character that appears in Revenge, searching for Orphen and journeys with him in order to turn him into the Royal Order. She is a kind, clumsy shy girl who wears glasses which she tends to lose. Unbeknownst to herself, she harbors several secrets and is in fact being manipulated.

Supporting characters

She's Orphen's foster sister, best friend, and the Bloody August. They were in the same orphanage and came to the Tower of Fang together, believed to be magical prodigies. She tutored him extensively, and gave him special attention. She was a great sorcerer - considered to be one of the greatest in her generation, and is referred to as the "Chaos Witch" by some at the Tower. She is a master of Black Magic and one of the few sorcerers that can harness White Magic. However, she had two sides to her. There was the kind, fun-loving and charismatic Azalie, and then the, as Orphen says, "scary" Azalie. After having her love declaration to her mentor rejected, she seemed to be almost obsessed with her studies; she wanted more power, and one of her experiments turned her into Bloody August - a name given to the demonic dragon that first appeared in August. In the novels, Azalie is returned to a human state fairly early in the series, but her mind has been warped by her time spent as the beast and the cruelties endured by those in the Tower who had been hunting her. Vengeful and partially insane, her main goal is to destroy the Tower and uncover Childman's true ambitions, which leads her to becoming a major antagonist in the series. She becomes increasingly unstable and Orphen is often torn between his attachment to her and his horror at her remorseless violence.

Orphen, Heartia, and Azalie's Master and the most powerful sorcerer of the Kiesalhima Continent. In the novels, His original name was Alfredo Mines and was the disciple and son of Sister Istersiva, a Nornir priestess of the Three Sisters of Fate, as well as a diplomatic ambassador for both the Dragon and human race. He was later sent 200 years into the future by Sister Istersiva with a time spell. He later adopts the name "Childman Powderfield" as his primary identity and becomes an assassin, then eventually a teacher at the Tower of Fang.  He is Orphen's primary antagonist for the better part of the original anime, as Orphen believes he really wants to kill Azalie. Heartia tries to convince Orphen that Childman isn't his enemy, but in the end, it fails. In actuality, he was trying to restore Azalie himself since he felt personally responsible for the tragedy that befell her. And at some point, things get even worse; when he tries to face the Bloody August, Azalie uses white magic to transfer her soul into his body, leaving Childman's soul trapped within the Bloody August. In the first manga adaptation, however, Orphen continues to secretly train under Childman after leaving the Tower, doing somewhat unsavory odd jobs for him that he does not wish to bring to the notice of the Tower. In the novels, he is killed by Azalie while inhabiting her mutated body, but not before revealing to Orphen that Azalie had transferred her soul to his body.

Orphen's childhood friend and fellow sorcerer. They met at the Tower of Fang. He is on Childman's side, instead of Orphen's, however, making it seem as though Heartia is Orphen's enemy. However, Heartia truly cares about Orphen and considers him to be his best friend.  He is also a fan of the (fictional) manga, Black Tiger, and assumes the guise of its main character and namesake on occasion. However, the manga is fairly obscure, so Dortin (Magic in the first anime) mistakenly assumes his name refers to the Penaeus monodon, a type of prawn sometimes called "Black Tiger", resulting in Heartia's receiving the nickname, "Shrimp Man", much to his own chagrin. In the novels, the Black Tiger costume that he dons is actually a magical garb created by the Nornir that was owned by the original (real) Black Tiger from over 150 years ago and retains his consciousness within the mask. Heartia's appearances are less prominent in the novel series, though his origins are similar. Heartia was also noted to be a notorious womanizer as he frequently dated multiple female sorcerers at the Tower of Fang, but his relationships typically last for only two weeks. 

Childman's rival in the Tower of Fang and enemy to Orphen and Azalie. Although he ranks closely to Childman in terms of recognition, it is heavily implied that his mother Lady Shastanassie, one of the Elders, has influenced this. Indeed, he seems to rely on her for everything from emotional consolation to advice in his endeavors. Deprived of her guidance, he becomes quite mentally unstable, as seen at the end of the first season. Childman himself later states that Flameheart actually had very little strength or potential as a sorcerer. Flameheart is an original character that only appears in the first anime series.

 She is Orphen's other foster sister and childhood friend as well as one of his classmates at the Tower, though she is five years older than Orphen. She, Orphen and Azalie grew up together in an orphanage in Raindust before they were taken in by the Tower of Fangs. She has an intense rivalry with Azalie, in spite of the fact that they are cousins, and are often depicted as fighting in the novels. Leticia is considered to be the second most powerful sorcerer of Childman's students besides Azalie and has a fearsome reputation similar to her cousin's. Her most notable strength is the gift of vocal manipulation, which earned her the nickname "The Scream of Death" while in her studies at the Tower. Later, she is made the Inquisitor of the Tower of Fang and seems to hint at being in love with Orphen. Orphen shortens her name to Tish in most cases. She appears in volumes five and six of the manga, and is seen throughout nearly all of the original set of novels. At Claiomh's behest, she becomes the heiress's master in the art of sorcery. She eventually falls in love and marries Forte, which leads to the birth of her son, Mayor MacCredy.
Stephanie

 Orphen's old friend. Stephanie "Steph" used to be a sorcerer named Stephan until he was mortally injured by a fanatical lynch mob that despised sorcerers, and battered his body beyond recognition, becoming a trans woman with the name of Stephanie.  This incident required Orphen to save him and take him to a clinic where Orphen was working at the time. During the healing process, Stephan requested that the doctor of the clinic to perform sex reassignment surgery on his body, with the aid of his own magic, and became Stephanie. Consequently, this rendered Stephanie nearly incapable of sorcery. Now, she works as an archaeologist deciphering the runes of the 'deities' (called the Nornir or "The Heavenly Ones") that fought against the sorcerers years ago. She is first introduced in the series when the group goes to Alenhatan and her familiarity with Orphen makes Claiomh jealous at first. At the end of the second novel, she eventually leaves Alenhatan to return home to her family. In the anime, she still lives in Alenhatan and has a boyfriend named Tim (who she eventually marries) but still often seen helping Orphen and the others when they need someone who knows how to read and use the Nornir language/symbols.
Lai

 Lai is a sorcerer that goes to the Tower of Fang that is friends with Hardia and is one of Childman's apprentices. Lai is portrayed as a powerful seer and is able to find people or things if he goes into a deep meditation. He can also tell people's 'presence' apart, something that gets him in trouble and sealed into ice by Azalie (who was possessing Childman's body at the time) because he noticed that her presence wasn't in the Bloody August anymore. Lai is an original character that appears only in the anime continuity.
Mariabella Everlasting

 She is Claiomh's older sister and is seen at the beginning of the anime. She first saw Orphen when he was watching over the Sword of Baltanders and thinks he was watching her (and thinking him handsome she develops a crush on him). In the novel, she meets him during a marriage interview arranged by Volkan.  In the anime, she and Claiomh were kidnapped by Azalie to persuade Orphen to give the Sword over to her, but both were eventually rescued by Orphen. In spite of her demure appearance and outward personality, she is as energetic as her younger sister.
Eris

In the anime, she is a sorcerer and student of Hardia's whom harbors a large crush on Majic and tends to wear magical girl costumes to match her master's aesthetics. In the original novels, she and her mother are the owners of a hot spring resort and Eris has no romantic interest in Majic at all.
Erukarena

The main villainess of Orphen: Revenge. She is a creature known as Sorcerous Beast, a destructive monster that absorbs and devours all forms of magic. She was sealed away by the Nornir hundreds of years go until she deceived Lycoris' father into capturing and feeding her sorcerers to regain her lost power and break free of her prison. 
Esperanza Reika

Older sister of Lycoris.

A member of the Childman Class. He was known to have a penchant for weird inventions that often resulted in chaos (although it was revealed that Azalie tweaked some of them without his knowledge). While he lacked in offensive power, he was the best healer of the class and was secretly in love with Leticia. He was burned to cinders during the expedition to hunt Azalie in her Dragon form.

A member of the Childman Class. He is a powerful sorcerer who presides over a large information network. He was always known to be stern, serious and quite studious. Through his information network he ultimately learned of Azalie's survival and Childman's demise. He was set to be Majic's instructor in the Tower of Fangs.
Uoar Curlaine

The instructor of the Uoar Class who specializes on Stabbing, the art of Sorcerer assassination. He is a rival to Childman who secretly plots to overthrow the latter's class, viewing them as a threat to his ambitions to seize control of the Tower of Fangs. For a time he trained Orphen, then Krylancelo in assassination techniques. He tried to obtain the World Transcript, a book rumored to be written by the God, Swedenborge and said to contain magic secrets which he believed was the source of Childman's power and influence in the Tower. For that purpose he had his class attack the alumni of the Childman Class taking advantage of Childman's absence. He ultimately fails when Orphen, Forte and Azalie corner him with Orphen nearly killing him. Azalie proceeds to wipe out his class' memories of her and he and his class are arrested by Forte.
Hydrant

A member of Uoar's Class and a Stabber whose real name is Miram Toram. Five years ago, he got the left half of his face scarred by Krylancelo in a fit when Hydrant provoked Krylancelo with the revelation that he was trained in order to kill Azalie should the need come. Ever since, he has held a grudge against Orphen and seeks to kill him committing multiple assassinations in the meantime. He is a powerful Stabber with more skill over Sorcery than Orphen, but is weaker in martial arts which Orphen exploits to defeat him. He was nearly killed by Orphen, but was prevented from doing so when Claiomh interrupted their fight. He was eventually arrested along the rest of the Uoar Class.
Swain

A member of Uoar's Class and a Stabber. He was sent along with Hydrant to retrieve the World Transcript from the Childman Class by orders of Uoar in order to seize its power and take control over the Tower of Fangs. For that purpose he teamed with Hydrant and attacked Tish and Orphen, almost killing the former when ambushing her. He had a brief encounter with Majic for ownership of the desired book (in truth a fake), and was heavily injured by Forte. He is arrested along the rest of the Uoar class.
Mädchen Amick

Salua

Quo

Carlotta

Name

Pope Ramonirok

Lapointe

Sister Istersiva

Anastasia

Glossary

Dragons
Dragons are creatures that can manipulate magic. Legend has it that the Dragon tribes stole "Magic", the power to remake the world, from the Gods and converted it into "Sorcery", magic that can be used by themselves. In a broad sense, human magicians are also counted as among the dragon races, but in general, it refers to the original six. "XX Dragon" is the name of the beings that manipulates magic, and the original species' names are the following: Nornir, Fenrir, etc. The Dragons have potential far exceeding humans as living creatures, and their magic is also extremely powerful. A physical characteristic common to the dragon races are their green pupils, but that has changed due to the poison (curse) imposed on them by the Gods. Although they are referred to as dragons, none of the species adhere to the typical form associated by the word "Dragon" as winged, lizard-like monsters. However, there are a surprising number of people in general society who are able recognize the dragon race, with information being mixed with the mythical "True Dragon" known as Ouroboros and a race of winged reptiles called Dynasoa.

Weird Dragon - Nornir
Known as the "Celestials" or the "Heavenly Ones", their basic appearance is similar to that of humans though they have green hair and eyes as a result of their mana awakening at a young age. They were originally a subterranean species that were known for creating mystical armor and weaponry. In the past, they ruled over the continent of Kiesalhima, but after their battle against the "Demon Beast Basilicock" sent by "God", it was said to that their species rapidly declined or were destroyed. The curse received from the goddesses rendered male Nornir sterile, so as to prevent the race as a whole from propagating. When the male Nornir eventually died out, the females tried to keep their race alive by interbreeding with humans, which led to the birth of human magicians.
Deep Dragon - Fenrir
Deep Dragons have the appearances of giant black wolves. They are known for their ferocity in battle and have been called "Dragon Warriors". Their curse deprives them of individual thought and speech, so they have existed as a hive mind of sorts. Additionally, they are an aquatic race in spite of their wolven appearance and often sleep within lakes or lagoons.
Red Dragon - Berserker
Red Dragons have the form of a large red-haired bear, but no one has ever seen their true appearance. Its physical shape-shifting capabilities are said to be specialized for assassination. It is also considered a disgrace by the Red Dragon tribe for anyone to see the areas of their body where they visibly change their form with their magic, as it is expected by their kind that they should be able to shift fluidly and instantaneously without notice. Because of the curse, they have forgotten their original form and are incapable of producing offspring due to this fact.
Mist Dragon - Troll
Its appearance is similar to that of a rhinoceros carrying what appears to be a tower on its back. Their bodies are extremely durable, and their skin can even withstand the temperature of lava. It can generate bullets from its body by consuming rock and metal, which can ejected from the numerous "barrels" on its back, and the power of a single bullet is enough to destroy a steel ship. Its wisdom and intelligence is said to have been lost due to the curse. It's said that Mist Dragons are the ones that human beings are the most likely out of the six dragon tribes to encounter in their lives (aside from the Red Dragons, which can mimic the form of humans) as well as one of the most dangerous, because it is designated as a walking disaster that will indiscriminately cause wide-scale destruction within miles with its ability to manipulate the atmosphere.
Fairy Dragon - Valkyrie
These dragons resembles crimson cats with manes akin to that of a lion's. They are known by their collective moniker as "The Beasts of Peace". As a result of the Goddesses' curse, they have lost all five of their senses and do not respond to external stimuli at all.
War Dragon - Sleipnir
It resembles a giant horse and has also been nicknamed "The Steel Warhorse". It is said that it once built a mighty military state, but now it lives in the territory of Masmaturia (The country of Volkan and Dortin's dwarven race) and all of its kind are currently sleeping. The local territory is incredibly frigid because of the cool air constantly released from the body of the War Dragon.
Magic
The magic of this world cannot be generated without using something as a medium. The magic used by human magicians uses their voice as a medium and is called "Vocal Sorcery ". The effective range is within the reach of the voice, and the composition by magical power (the image of the magic that can only be perceived by the magician, of course the composition of the vocal magic can also be perceived by the dragon race), and the range of the magic is determined by the spell. Since speech is the medium for exercising magic, it can be anything that the sorcerer screams at the time of activation, and it has nothing to do with the meaning of the words and the content of the magic you are activating as long as the sorcerer can visualize the intention and effect of the spell. However, most magicians use their own spells, for example because it is difficult to concentrate on the composition of words that are too sudden. It can be activated not only with screams but also with normal conversations, songs and moans, so it is extremely difficult to neutralize the magician while they remain conscious. The magic of human sorcerers is classified into two types: Black Magic and White Magic. Black Magic mainly interferes with physical phenomena such as heat and light. White Magic manipulates time, the mind, the soul of the individual(s) and can ignore all physical laws. Because White Magic is overwhelmingly rare and has great power, almost all users are imprisoned in a fortress called "Mist Falls" by the Aristocratic Federation. However, the white magicians are there voluntarily because there is no reason to leave, and it is almost impossible to stop the white magicians from trying to escape. In addition, there are white mages known as "psychologists", who have left their bodies and become only spirits. Their state of being is almost similar to that of a ghost, and they can use magic with far greater power and efficiency than they would in a physical body, but it's very difficult for them to maintain their human ego and general sanity without a physical vessel to keep their consciousness grounded. Alternatively, a white sorcerer who maintains their physical body is also called a "physicist". It is also stated that it is impossible for ordinary humans to harness magic without a dragon lineage. However, certain magical artifacts imbued with innate magical energy can be activated and wielded by normal humans.

The magic that the Dragon races handle is as follows:

Silence Magic 
A sorcery wielded by the Weird Dragons which uses runes (or Wyrd Glyphs) as a medium. Typically, the caster can trace runes in the air or on a solid surface to execute a spell. Furthermore, by engraving magic characters on objects, it is possible to create products with additional magical functions. These are called "The Legacy of the Nornir" and have various shapes and functions such as rings, clothes, weapons, armor, robots (Killing Dolls), and large-scale facilities.

Destruction Magic 
A sorcery wielded by the War Dragons which only requires thought as a medium. It specializes in utter annihilation and is considered the strongest magic in terms of sheer power and magnitude. However, there is no specific description of "destruction magic".

Dark Magic 
A sorcery wielded by the Deep Dragons which uses sight as medium. Using a person's line of sight, Dark Magic imposes and dominates everything, including organic and inorganic matter. It easily allows an individual to manipulate space itself, deflect physical and magical attacks, erase minds and extinguish souls (or restore them), eradicate objects instantaneously, etc. If a normal human becomes the familiar to a Deep Dragon, they will gain access to their magic and, in the case that the familiar is a sorcerer, their magical capacity increases substantially as well. Additionally, their five senses are linked with the Dragon's and vice versa. This can also prove potentially detrimental due to the distinct possibility that the consciousness of the human and Deep Dragon may merge after prolonged exposure to one another's psyche.

Spirit Magic 
A sorcery utilized by Fairy Dragons by signing contracts with spirits (natural phenomena with intentions). A mutual agreement between both parties are necessary to use the contract as a medium, and it does not act at all outside the scope of the contract. However, the called-upon spirit will overcome all obstacles (and is not limited by physical and supernatural means, nor time and space) to fulfill the contract, even if the contract entails conditions such as the obliteration of an entire city. By using the magical tools that were left behind by the Fairy Dragons, humans can reproduce this magic to a limited extent.

Beastization Magic
A sorcery used by the Red Dragons that requires one to use their body as a medium, which will allow them to change into various states. It allows one to gain powerful shape-shifting abilities in combination with augmenting the user's strength, such as the ability change the shape of their limbs into weapons such as whips or spears, regeneration, fluidization and complete transparency of the body.

Atmospheric Magic 
A sorcery wielded by the Mist Dragons that uses smell as medium and gives one the ability to manipulate the weather. While the power itself is regarded as weaker than that of other dragon races (except for black and white magic), the effective range of this magic spans for several kilometers.
Yggdrasil
Also known as the World Tree. It is the home dimension in which the Gods reside in.
The Tower of Fang
One of the most prestigious magician training institutions in Kiesalhima. They gather orphans with magical skills from various places and nurture them in classroom units, and those within Childman's classrooms are among the most exceptional. It is also the headquarters of the Confederate Magician Alliance (Damzul's Oryzans), and self-government is carried out by the highest executive department centered on the Tower's council of Elders. The name originates from the ruins of a celestial race in the city of Tafrem, "World Map Tower", and the structure of the building is more akin to a fortress. Buildings are fortified with magic to prevent damage to the structure.
The Three Goddesses of Fate (The Weird Sisters)
The Three Goddesses of Fate: Urd (Goddess of the Past), Verdandi (Goddess of the Present), and Skuld (Goddess of the Future). In the past, it was said that the dragon race was annihilated by them to correct the distorted world structure. Those who worship the goddess trio despise the sorcerers who are a mixed race of human and dragon. The "Holy City" of Kimluck, the main headquarters of the Kimluck Church, absolutely forbids any magician from entering.
Demon King Swedenborge
A rogue God who rebelled against his fellow deities - including the Weird Sisters - and sought to eliminate them so that he could be "The True God". He is the creator of Midgard, the world in which Sorcerous Stabber Orphen takes place. He devised his own magic system known as "Demon Magic Arts", which exists on a completely different level than most magic since it was created to either seal or destroy Vampires and Gods on existential scale. Later in the novels, Orphen summons Swedenborge and is consequently bestowed with his knowledge and power, which earns him the title of "Demon King".
Kimluck Church
A religious organization that believes in the three goddesses of fate. Their followers are typically referred to as Dragon Cultists. They have their own assault unit known as the "Death Teachers" for the purpose of assassinating heretical teachers that betray the faith of the three Goddesses as well as sorcerers, whom they believe should be eradicated for their mixed blood. They receive anti-mage combat training at a young age and wield special tempered glass swords, of which there are only eight on the continent, as well as magical technology left behind by the Dragon Races. The Yggdrasil Cathedral is their main base of operations and boasts magical and spiritual defenses that surpass even the Tower of Fangs.
Dragon Faith
A fanatical organization of religious worshipers who, unlike the Kimluck Church, believe that the Dragons are the true rulers of the Kiesalhima Continent and rebuff the Gods' claim of ownership.
Thirteen Apostles
An elite unit of court sorcerers who are subordinate to the Aristocratic Federation. The Thirteen Apostles are the most powerful sorcerers on the Kiesalhima continent, and their army consists of no more than one-hundred top-ranked mages. The chief executive and leader of the Apostles is Pluto "The Demon of the Capitol". Agents are also dispatched to the Tower of Fang to scout for more candidates. Orphen himself was once considered a prime candidate to become an Apostle as a child, but declined.
Stabbers
Sorcerers who are trained in the art of combat and assassination to dispatch other Sorcerers as well as other magical entities such as the Dragon races.
Ginunggagap
The origin of the original world, which was a lifeless and endless void.
Ymir
An ancient race of immortal giants who originally inhabited Ginunggap and are the predecessors of the Gods. They were immensely powerful and nearly perfect organisms that were said to exist in Ginnuggap, which was originally an infinite and lifeless void. When the Gods emerged, a war was waged between them and the Giants until they were eventually annihilated. Since their bodies do not decompose upon death, the Gods used their corpses and transmuted them into "perfect material" to create the foundation of Jotunheimr, The Giant's Continent.
Ouroboros
A colossal immortal snake that encircles the world. It was the last of the remaining Ymir to survive the Gods' systematic annihilation of its kind as it was virtually indestructible and far too large for them to destroy. Instead, they decided to create a new world within its coils as it slept, which would later be known as Midgard.

References

Sorcerous Stabber Orphen